Harold Hastings Reeve (25 March 1908 – 15 November 1973) was an Australian public servant. He was briefly Administrator of Nauru in 1949, before joining the civil service in the Territory of Papua and New Guinea in 1950, where he held several senior positions until his retirement in 1966, including serving in the Legislative Council and House of Assembly.

Biography
Reeve was born in Sydney in 1908. He became a master builder, before joining the Commonwealth Treasury in 1941. In 1949 he briefly served as Administrator of Nauru, before moving to the Territory of Papua and New Guinea to become Director of Finance and Treasurer in 1950, also becoming a member of the Executive Council.

In 1951 he became an official member of the new Legislative Council. In 1961 he became Assistant Administrator (Economic Affairs), and when the new House of Assembly was created in 1964, he continued as an official member.

Reeve retired in 1966. He died in Sydney in 1973 and was survived by his wife Kathleen and two children.

References

1908 births
People from Sydney
Australian builders
Australian public servants
Administrators of Nauru
Papua New Guinean civil servants
Members of the Legislative Council of Papua and New Guinea
Members of the House of Assembly of Papua and New Guinea
1973 deaths